Letioukbala is a town in north-western Republic of Congo. It is near the border with Cameroon and Gabon.

Mining 
It is near the location of iron ore deposits.

See also 
 Iron ore in Africa

References

External links 
 WorldCityDB

Populated places in the Republic of the Congo